Springvalia isolata is a species of small freshwater snails which have an operculum, aquatic gastropod mollusks in the family Tateidae. 

This species is endemic to Australia.

See also
 List of non-marine molluscs of Australia

References

Further reading

External links

Tateidae
Gastropods of Australia
Endemic fauna of Australia
Vulnerable fauna of Australia
Gastropods described in 1990